HNLMS Dolfijn may refer to following ships of the Royal Netherlands Navy:

 , ex-
 , ex-
 , a 
  (S808), a

See also
De Dolfijn, a Dutch ship involved in the Kettle War of 1784

Royal Netherlands Navy ship names